Notholirion is a small Asian genus of bulbous plants in the lily family, Liliaceae. It is closely related to Lilium, but each individual flowers only once, and then dies after producing offsets. The bulb is covered by a tunic. Leaves are basal, produced in autumn and winter.

Taxonomy 

Baker (1874) considered Notholirion to be a subgenus of Fritillaria, but Boissier (1884) separated it as a distinct genus.  The evolutionary and phylogenetic relationships between the genera currently included in Liliaceae are shown in the following Cladogram:

Species 

List of species:
 Notholirion bulbiferum (Lingelsh.) Stearn - Nepal, Bhutan, Sikkim, Assam, Myanmar, Gansu, Shaanxi, Sichuan, Tibet, Yunnan
 Notholirion koeiei Rech.f. - Iran + Iraq
 Notholirion macrophyllum (D.Don) Boiss. -  Tibet, Nepal, Sichuan, Yunnan, Bhutan, and Sikkim
 Notholirion thomsonianum (Royle) Stapf - Afghanistan, Himalayas of northern Pakistan + northern India

References

Bibliography 

 
 

Liliaceae
Liliaceae genera
Taxa named by Nathaniel Wallich
Taxa named by Pierre Edmond Boissier